The Fiske Theatre in Oak Grove, Louisiana is a theatre that was built in 1928 and rebuilt in 1950.

It was rebuilt in 1950 into the Moderne style, to design by architect Bradford W. Stevens.

It was renovated in 2008.

It was listed on the U.S. National Register of Historic Places in 2014.

References

Theatres in Louisiana
National Register of Historic Places in Louisiana
Buildings and structures completed in 1928
Buildings and structures in West Feliciana Parish, Louisiana